Ketteridge is a surname. Notable people with the surname include:

Martin Ketteridge (born 1964), Scottish rugby league player
Steve Ketteridge (born 1959), English footballer